Roger Chaunce (fl. 1377-1399), of Reigate, Surrey, was an English Member of Parliament.

He was a Member (MP) of the Parliament of England for Reigate in October 1377, 1378, January 1380, 1391 and 1399.

References

14th-century births
Year of death missing
14th-century English people
People from Reigate
Members of the Parliament of England (pre-1707)